Buna is a small town and Sub-County in Wajir County, situated in the North Eastern Province in Kenya. Nearby towns and places include Ajao and Bute Helu.

History

Buna historically is remembered as the deepest point of penetration by the Italian Army during World War II in Kenya. The city was occupied in July 1940 and an Italian garrison remained there until January 1941

Climate

See also
Wajir County
North Eastern Province

References

External links
National Geospatial-Intelligence Agency - Buna

Wajir County
North Eastern Province (Kenya)
Populated places in North Eastern Province (Kenya)
County capitals in Kenya